Apostolepis pymi is a species of snake in the family Colubridae. It is found in Brazil.

References 

pymi
Reptiles described in 1903
Reptiles of Brazil
Taxa named by George Albert Boulenger